It was the first edition of the tournament. 
Renzo Olivo and Horacio Zeballos won the title, defeating Julio Peralta and Matt Seeberger in the final, 7–5, 6–3.

Seeds

Draw

External links
 Main Draw

Hoff Open - Doubles
2015